LD50 is the median lethal dose in toxicology.

LD50 may also refer to:

 L.D. 50 (album), an album by Mudvayne
 LD 50 Lethal Dose, a 2003 UK film
 "LD50", an episode of NCIS: Los Angeles